Jan Smyrak (born 26 November 1950) is a retired Polish and later German cyclist. He won a bronze medal in the 100 km  team time trial at the 1971 UCI Road World Championships. He competed at the 1972 Summer Olympics in the individual road race, but failed to finish. He was second in the Tour de Pologne in 1971 and won the Rund um Köln in 1975. He became German citizen some time after the 1972 Olympics.

References 

1950 births
Living people
People from Radków
Cyclists at the 1972 Summer Olympics
Olympic cyclists of Poland
Polish male cyclists
Sportspeople from Lower Silesian Voivodeship